Macrocoma peyerimhoffi is a species of leaf beetle of Morocco, described by Louis Kocher in 1959.

References

peyerimhoffi
Beetles of North Africa
Beetles described in 1959
Endemic fauna of Morocco